Hsieh Su-wei and Peng Shuai were the defending champions, but Peng withdrew from the tournament with a back injury. Hsieh played alongside Flavia Pennetta, but lost in the first round to Klaudia Jans-Ignacik and Andreja Klepač.

First-time pairing Martina Hingis and Sania Mirza won the title, defeating Ekaterina Makarova and Elena Vesnina in the final, 6–3, 6–4.

Seeds

Draw

Finals

Top half

Bottom half

References
 Main Draw

BNP Paribas Open - Women's Doubles
2015 BNP Paribas Open